Ponoviče is a settlement along the left bank of the Sava River in the Municipality of Litija in central Slovenia. The railway line from Ljubljana to Zidani Most runs through the settlement. The area is part of the traditional region of Upper Carniola. It is now included with the rest of the municipality in the Central Sava Statistical Region. The settlement includes the hamlets of Mačkovina and Smrekarica.

Name
Ponoviče was attested in historical documents as Penobitsch in 1483 and Panabitsch in 1486.

Castles

Knežija Castle formerly stood on the hill above Mačkovina. It was first mentioned in written sources in 1469.

A large 16th-century mansion with surrounding grounds, known as Ponoviče Castle, stands on a small elevation above the banks of the Sava east of the settlement.

References

External links

Ponoviče on Geopedia

Populated places in the Municipality of Litija